Rachel Ford Thompson (31 August 1856 – 9 December 1906) was an English botanist and temperance activist.

The daughter of Quaker botanist Silvanus Thompson (1818–1881) and Bridget Tatham, Her father was the headteacher at the Quaker school in York. She was born in York. From 1882 to 1893, she studied flora in Yorkshire. She aided Frederick Janson Hanbury with his studies of Hieracium. She contributed to F.A. Lees' Flora of West Yorkshire and Cardale Babington's Manual of British Botany, in which she developed "an entirely fresh account of the genus" Hieracium.

She was also an active member of the Women's Temperance Union.

Thompson died in Southport at the age of 50.

Her brother Sylvanus P. Thompson was a physics professor and electrical engineer.

References 

1856 births
1906 deaths
English botanists
English temperance activists